Belina is a Polish coat of arms. It was used by several szlachta families in the times of the Polish–Lithuanian Commonwealth.

Blazon

Azure, between horseshoes argent, two facing each, the third in base, a sword proper. the hilt in chief or. Crest: A dexter arm embowed in armour or, holding a sword pointed to the right.

Notable bearers
Notable bearers of this coat of arms include:
 Andrus Konotopski

See also
 Polish heraldry
 Heraldic family
 List of Polish nobility coats of arms

Bibliography
 Tadeusz Gajl: Herbarz polski od średniowiecza do XX wieku : ponad 4500 herbów szlacheckich 37 tysięcy nazwisk 55 tysięcy rodów. L&L, 2007. .

References

External links

Belina